John Laurence Wilcox, BSC (7 May 1913 – 31 May 1979) was a British cinematographer. 
He frequently worked with director Freddie Francis and photographed many popular British films, including Carve Her Name with Pride, Summer Holiday and Dr. Who and the Daleks.

The nephew of the director and producer Herbert Wilcox, he began his film career in 1930 as an often uncredited second camera assistant to Freddie Young. His involvement as a cameraman included work on The Third Man and Outcast of the Islands, and made his debut as chief camera operator in 1951 with Mr. Denning Drives North.

Selected filmography
1951: Mr. Denning Drives North
1951: Outcast of the Islands
1954: Hell Below Zero
1954: The Black Knight
1955: The Cockleshell Heroes
1956: Safari
1958: Harry Black
1958: Carve Her Name with Pride
1959: The Mouse that Roared
1959: Expresso Bongo
1959: A Touch of Larceny
1961: Mr. Topaze
1962: Only Two Can Play
1962: Waltz of theToreadors
1963: Summer Holiday
1964: Nightmare
1964: The Evil of Frankenstein
1965: The Skull
1966: The Psychopath
1966: Daleks' Invasion Earth 2150 A.D.
1967: The Deadly Bees
1968: The Limbo Line
1969: The Chairman
1970: Connecting Rooms
1971: The Last Valley
1972: Steptoe & Son
1973: The Belstone Fox
1974: Craze
1974: The Legend of the 7 Golden Vampires
1975: The Ghoul
1978: The Hound of the Baskervilles

References

External links
 

1913 births
1979 deaths
British cinematographers
English cinematographers
People from Stoke-on-Trent